Peter McDonald is a former Scottish professional darts player.

Darts career
McDonald first qualified for the Embassy World Professional Darts Championship in 1987, losing in the first round 3–1 to Sweden's Lars Erik Karlsson.  He returned two years later in 1989 but again lost in the first round, 3–0 to Mike Gregory.

World Championship results

BDO
 1987: Last 32: (lost to Lars Erik Karlsson 1–3) 
 1989: Last 32: (lost to Mike Gregory 0–3)

External links
Peter McDonald's profile and stats on Darts Database

Scottish darts players
Living people
British Darts Organisation players
Year of birth missing (living people)